Shah Abbasi Caravansarai may refer to:

Shah Abbasi Caravansarai, Bisotun
Shah Abbas Caravanserai, Ganja
Shah Abbasi Caravansarai, Karaj
Shah Abbasi Caravansarai, Nishapur
Shah Abbasi Caravansarai, Ray
Shah Abbasi Caravanserai, Farasfaj